Branchiostegus auratus is a species of marine ray-finned fish, a tilefish belonging to the family Malacanthidae. It is found in the Western Pacific, from southern Japan and also in the East China Sea.

References

Malacanthidae
Taxa named by Kamakichi Kishinouye
Fish described in 1907